James Edward Thompson Jr. (October 13, 1935 – June 8, 2017) was a United States Army officer.  He attained the rank of lieutenant general and was a commander of the 101st Airborne Division and First United States Army.

Early life
James Edward Thompson Jr. was born in Durham, North Carolina on October 13, 1935, and graduated from the University of Florida in 1957 with a Bachelor of Arts in education. While in college, Thompson completed the Reserve Officers' Training Corps program, and at his graduation he was commissioned a second lieutenant of Infantry.

Military education
After receiving his commission, Thompson completed the Infantry Officer Basic Course. His later military education included the Infantry Officer Advanced Course, Air Command and Staff College, and United States Army War College. In addition, he received a Master of Arts in political science from Auburn University.

Military career

Early career
During the Vietnam War, Thompson commanded the 162nd Aviation Company (Assault Helicopter) during the first half of 1968.  Thompson's later field grade officer assignments included: commander, 1st Battalion, 5th Infantry Regiment, 25th Infantry Division; assistant chief of staff for operations, plans and training (G-3), 25th Infantry Division; director, military planning studies (European regions), Army War College; and commander, 3d Brigade, 101st Airborne Division.

General officer
After receiving promotion to brigadier general, Thompson's assignments included: assistant division commander (ADC) for support and ADC for operations, 101st Airborne Division, Kentucky; deputy director for plans and policy, United States Pacific Command; and deputy director for operations, readiness, and mobilization in the Office of the Army's Deputy Chief of Staff for Operations (G-3).

Thompson was assigned as commander of the 101st Airborne Division in August 1983, and he served until June 1985. From 1985 to 1987, Thompson was commandant of the United States Army War College.

In June 1987, Thompson was assigned as commander of First United States Army; he held this position until retiring in 1991.

Awards and decorations
Thompson's awards and decorations include:

Family
Thompson was married to Patricia (Cofer) Thompson. They were the parents of two children, James and Tamara.

Death and burial
In retirement, Thompson resided in St. Simons, Georgia. He died in Brunswick, Georgia on June 8, 2017. Thompson was buried at Christ Church Episcopal Cemetery in St. Simons.

References

Sources

Books

Internet

Newspapers

1935 births
2017 deaths
People from Durham, North Carolina
People from St. Simons, Georgia
University of Florida alumni
Air Command and Staff College alumni
United States Army War College alumni
Auburn University alumni
United States Army generals
United States Army personnel of the Vietnam War
Recipients of the Defense Superior Service Medal
Recipients of the Soldier's Medal
Recipients of the Distinguished Flying Cross (United States)
Recipients of the Air Medal
American Master Army Aviators
Recipients of the Distinguished Service Medal (US Army)